Major General David Anthony Somerset Pennefather,  (born 17 May 1945) is a former Royal Marines officer who served as Commandant General Royal Marines from 1996 to 1998.

Military career
Pennefather was educated at Wellington College and joined the Royal Marines in 1963. He was commissioned as an acting lieutenant in 1965. He was mentioned in despatches for service during the Falklands War.

Pennefather was Commanding Officer of 42 Commando from 1988 to 1990, and was appointed an Officer of the Order of the British Empire in 1990 "in recognition of meritorious service in Northern Ireland". He became commander of 3 Commando Brigade in 1992 and commander of the United Nations Rapid Reaction Force during the Bosnian War, for which he was appointed a Companion of the Order of the Bath. He went on to be Commandant General Royal Marines in 1996 before retiring in 1998.

Later life
In retirement Pennefather became Secretary of the Royal Humane Society, and a director of the Royal Naval Museum in Portsmouth.

References

1945 births
Living people
Royal Marines generals
Companions of the Order of the Bath
Officers of the Order of the British Empire
United Nations personnel in the Bosnian War
People educated at Wellington College, Berkshire